Break the Banks is the first and only LP from London-based indie rock band Battle. It was released on September 3, 2007.

Track listing
All songs written by Jason Bavanandan. All music written by Jason Bavanandan, Oliver Davies, James Ellis, Timothy Scudder.
 "The Longest Time" – 4:33
 "Negotiation" – 3:34
 "Demons" – 4:04
 "Paper Street" – 3:58
 "North Sea" – 3:48
 "Looking for Bullets" – 4:27
 "History" – 3:29
 "The Time for Talking Is Almost Over" – 2:39
 "Sit With Me" – 5:02
 "The Other Way" – 4:12

References

External links
 Interview with Battle

2007 debut albums
Battle (British band) albums
Transgressive Records albums